Pirama is a village on the island of Chios, Greece. It is the only settlement of the eponymous community, part of the municipal unit Amani. Pirama is 4 kilometers from the village Volissos and 44 from Chios Town. It is built on the flat top of a hill and elevation 220m. At the 2011 census it had 44 inhabitants.

The sights of the village include a Venetian tower in the square of the village. Pirama also has a cultural club, located in the village school.

Village's main church is the St. John the Baptist and still has many chapels. The festival of the village celebrated on August 29, celebration day ablation of the Honest Head of John the Baptist, when central church celebrates.

See also
List of settlements in the Chios regional unit

References

External links

chiosonline.gr

Populated places in Chios (regional unit)
Populated places in Chios